{

The following are lists of members of the Victorian Legislative Assembly:

 Members of the Victorian Legislative Assembly, 1856–1859
 Members of the Victorian Legislative Assembly, 1859–1861
 Members of the Victorian Legislative Assembly, 1861–1864
 Members of the Victorian Legislative Assembly, 1864–1865
 Members of the Victorian Legislative Assembly, 1866–1867
 Members of the Victorian Legislative Assembly, 1868–1871
 Members of the Victorian Legislative Assembly, 1871–1874
 Members of the Victorian Legislative Assembly, 1874–1877
 Members of the Victorian Legislative Assembly, 1877–1880
 Members of the Victorian Legislative Assembly, 1880–1880
 Members of the Victorian Legislative Assembly, 1880–1883
 Members of the Victorian Legislative Assembly, 1883–1886
 Members of the Victorian Legislative Assembly, 1886–1889
 Members of the Victorian Legislative Assembly, 1889–1892
 Members of the Victorian Legislative Assembly, 1892–1894
 Members of the Victorian Legislative Assembly, 1894–1897
 Members of the Victorian Legislative Assembly, 1897–1900
 Members of the Victorian Legislative Assembly, 1900–1902
 Members of the Victorian Legislative Assembly, 1902–1904
 Members of the Victorian Legislative Assembly, 1904–1907
 Members of the Victorian Legislative Assembly, 1907–1908
 Members of the Victorian Legislative Assembly, 1908–1911
 Members of the Victorian Legislative Assembly, 1911–1914
 Members of the Victorian Legislative Assembly, 1914–1917
 Members of the Victorian Legislative Assembly, 1917–1920
 Members of the Victorian Legislative Assembly, 1920–1921
 Members of the Victorian Legislative Assembly, 1921–1924
 Members of the Victorian Legislative Assembly, 1924–1927
 Members of the Victorian Legislative Assembly, 1927–1929
 Members of the Victorian Legislative Assembly, 1929–1932
 Members of the Victorian Legislative Assembly, 1932–1935
 Members of the Victorian Legislative Assembly, 1935–1937
 Members of the Victorian Legislative Assembly, 1937–1940
 Members of the Victorian Legislative Assembly, 1940–1943
 Members of the Victorian Legislative Assembly, 1943–1945
 Members of the Victorian Legislative Assembly, 1945–1947
 Members of the Victorian Legislative Assembly, 1947–1950
 Members of the Victorian Legislative Assembly, 1950–1952
 Members of the Victorian Legislative Assembly, 1952–1955
 Members of the Victorian Legislative Assembly, 1955–1958
 Members of the Victorian Legislative Assembly, 1958–1961
 Members of the Victorian Legislative Assembly, 1961–1964
 Members of the Victorian Legislative Assembly, 1964–1967
 Members of the Victorian Legislative Assembly, 1967–1970
 Members of the Victorian Legislative Assembly, 1970–1973
 Members of the Victorian Legislative Assembly, 1973–1976
 Members of the Victorian Legislative Assembly, 1976–1979
 Members of the Victorian Legislative Assembly, 1979–1982
 Members of the Victorian Legislative Assembly, 1982–1985
 Members of the Victorian Legislative Assembly, 1985–1988
 Members of the Victorian Legislative Assembly, 1988–1992
 Members of the Victorian Legislative Assembly, 1992–1996
 Members of the Victorian Legislative Assembly, 1996–1999
 Members of the Victorian Legislative Assembly, 1999–2002
 Members of the Victorian Legislative Assembly, 2002–2006 
 Members of the Victorian Legislative Assembly, 2006–2010
 Members of the Victorian Legislative Assembly, 2010–2014
 Members of the Victorian Legislative Assembly, 2014–2018
Members of the Victorian Legislative Assembly, 2018-2022